Horst Brummeier (born 31 December 1945) is a retired Austrian football referee. He is known for having refereed one match in the 1986 FIFA World Cup. He also refereed one match in the 1988 UEFA European Football Championship in West Germany. He also refereed in the Champions League in from 1979–1989. He refereed in the OFB-Cup from 1975–1986.

References

External links
Profile

1945 births
Austrian football referees
FIFA World Cup referees
Living people
1986 FIFA World Cup referees
UEFA Euro 1988 referees
People from Traun
Sportspeople from Upper Austria